"Tricky, Tricky" is a song released by Lou Bega in 1999 from his debut album A Little Bit of Mambo. It became a modest hit in the USA and in Sweden, though was overshadowed by the smash-hit "Mambo No. 5". The lyrics tell of a woman that likes to spend a lot of money, and how the relationship between her and a man won't work.

Track listing 
Maxi single
 "Tricky, Tricky" (Radio Version) – 3:17
 "Tricky, Tricky" (Extended Mix) – 5:10
 "Tricky, Tricky" (Tricky Club Mix) – 5:28
 "Tricky, Tricky" (Instrumental) – 3:17

Chart performance

References

Lou Bega songs
1999 singles
RCA Records singles
1999 songs
Songs written by Lou Bega